Yazıdere is a village in the District of İncirliova, Aydın Province, Turkey. As of 2010, it had a population of 491 people.

References

Villages in İncirliova District